Lemonade stand may refer to:

 Lemonade stand, a business that is commonly owned and operated by a child or children, to sell lemonade
 Lemonade Stand, a computer game used to teach basic business, math, and computer skills
 Lemonade Stand, a 2011 album by Illinois (band)

See also
Alex's Lemonade Stand Foundation